The Afghanistan cricket team toured Bangladesh in September and October 2016 to play three One Day Internationals (ODIs) matches. This was Afghanistan's first full series against a Test-playing side other than Zimbabwe and was the first bilateral series between the two sides. It was also Bangladesh's first home bilateral ODI series against an Associate Nation since Ireland toured in 2008. Ahead of the ODI series there was a fifty-over warm-up game between the Bangladesh Cricket Board XI and Afghanistan in Fatullah.

Afghanistan won the warm-up match by 66 runs and Bangladesh won the ODI series 2–1. This was Bangladesh's sixth consecutive series victory in ODIs.

Squads

Taskin Ahmed was added to Bangladesh's squad after his bowling action was cleared by the International Cricket Council (ICC). Mosharraf Hossain was added to the squad for the third ODI after Rubel Hossain was dropped.

Tour match

One-day:Bangladesh Cricket Board XI vs Afghanistan

ODI series

1st ODI

2nd ODI

3rd ODI

References

External links
 Series home at ESPN Cricinfo

2016 in Afghan cricket
2016 in Bangladeshi cricket
International cricket competitions in 2016–17
Afghan cricket tours of Bangladesh